Aspirus Medford Hospital (formerly Memorial Health Center) is a non-profit, primary care health care organization in Taylor and Price Counties in north-central Wisconsin, United States. Headquartered in Medford, Wisconsin, it is composed of a hospital, a continuum of senior care services, therapy centers, a pharmacy, a fitness center and gym, and primary care clinics located in Gilman, Medford, Prentice, Rib Lake, and Phillips, Wisconsin. The organization is partnered with Aspirus in Wausau, Wisconsin. It employs 525 individuals in the region.

Summary
Aspirus Medford Hospital is a Critical Access Hospital with a Level III Trauma Center with access to Level II trauma treatment and a newborn intensive care unit. It is also a satellite campus of Aspirus's Heart & Vascular Institute.

Specialists and advanced medical procedures and technologies are available. Patient care areas include: allergy; anesthesia – pain management; audiology; behavioural health; cardiology; diabetes management; dialysis; ear, nose & throat; emergency services; endocrinology, general surgery; inpatient acute care; internal medicine; labor, birth and delivery; laboratory diagnostic services; medical nutrition therapy; nephrology; oncology and chemotherapy; ophthalmology; orthopedics; pharmacy; pathology; pulmonary - sleep disorders; pediatrics; radiology-imaging; social services; surgical services; therapy and rehabilitation; urology; and vascular.

History

Early years
In 1920, the privately owned Medford Clinic and Hospital was established by Dr. Conrad E. Nystrum (1869–1923), who had started his Medford practice in 1892.

Despite an expansion in 1932 to 34 beds, the clinic-hospital often struggled to house as many as 50 patients at one time. In 1959, it was estimated there were 4,000 patients each for the five practicing doctors in the area.

With funds from a Hill-Burton grant and community donations, a new Memorial Hospital of Taylor County (a 50-bed, 10-bassinet hospital) was built in Medford. It opened on March 14, 1962, with a final price tag of $953,873.72.

The Medford Clinic, a separate entity from the Memorial Hospital of Taylor County, had four physicians in 1962. Ten years later, in 1964, the Medford Clinic was purchased by Memorial Hospital of Taylor County.

Completed in September 1968 was the addition of a second floor to the north, south, and west wings of the hospital, increasing its bed count by 60. The $848,198.04 addition also included the expansion of the laboratory and X-ray departments, and the construction of a coronary care unit, a physical therapy area, a boiler room, and garage.

In October 1975, Memorial Hospital's critical care unit was completed.

In 1978 a 68-bed nursing home was attached to the hospital. Only private pay residents were admitted to the facility prior to its becoming Medicare certified in 1998.

In June 1983, an ultrasound machine was added to Memorial's services. In-house mammography and CT scans made their debut in 1984 and 1993 respectively. Digital mammography, mobile PET/CT and breast MRIs were introduced in 2008.

In August 1984, Cedar Court Apartments, a 24-unit senior low-income housing complex was established.

Continuing growth
In April 1990, Memorial Hospital and Community Health Care, Inc., the parent organization of Wausau Hospital, became affiliated. This provided access to more specialists, technology, cost-effective purchasing, and more active physician recruitment. Ownership and control of Memorial Hospital of Taylor County remained local, and the hospital continued to be a community, not-for-profit entity.

In February 1991, a new three-phase cardiac rehabilitation program began.

Memorial Hospital of Taylor County (Medford), Good Samaritan Health Center (Merrill), Langlade Memorial Hospital (Antigo) and Wausau Hospital created the Wisconsin Valley Health Network, a not-for-profit health care corporation in June 1996.

Memorial Health Center
• In 1999, Memorial Hospital of Taylor County changed its name to Memorial Health Center.

• In June 2000, Country Gardens - a residential care 28-unit apartment complex (RCAC), was opened.

• August 2000, Memorial Health Center opened a walk-in clinic under the direction of the hospital's emergency department.

• By March 2001, the clinics, hospital, and nursing home officially became one organization. Memorial also established a strategic and financial partnership with Aspirus, Inc. (Wausau).

• Memorial Health Center was designated a Critical Access Hospital in 2002. As a licensed Critical Access Hospital, Memorial Health Center receives cost-based reimbursement for treating Medicare and Medicaid patients. As a provision of this designation, the health center had to reduce its inpatient bed count down to a maximum of 25.

2004-2006 Expansion
In June 2004, Memorial Health Center began a $19.5 million expansion and renovation project. When construction was completed in 2006, the facility had grown by 80 percent - three surgical suites, private patient rooms, rooms designed for chemotherapy services, a new emergency department, and a new two-story clinic were the highlights.

The addition moved Memorial's Medford Therapy and Fitness to the vacated adjacent clinic building. It provided the therapy department with an additional , which was renovated into private therapeutic patient treatment rooms, a physical therapy gym, and public fitness center.

In 2005, Memorial Health Center was categorized as a Level III Trauma Care Facility, which is a standard above most other critical access hospitals.

In August 2008, Memorial offered expectant parents a new option in childbirth -- water births. It also opened a new Anticoagulation Clinic in late October 2008.

Memorial Health Center was designated an Aspirus Heart and Vascular Institute satellite campus in 2009 after it expanded its services to include a cardiac device clinic, diagnostic studies including echocardiograms, stress testing, and nuclear cardiology, vascular specialists and services, Level 1 treatment of cardiac patients (streamlined diagnosis, transfer, treatments, and the inclusion of an Aspirus MedEvac transport vehicle and paramedic), and an anticoagulation clinic.

Later that same year, 2009, Memorial Health Center also opened a kidney care center offering dialysis services.

References

External links
 
 Aspirus

Hospital buildings completed in 1920
Hospital buildings completed in 2006
Hospitals in Wisconsin
Buildings and structures in Taylor County, Wisconsin